DHO may refer to:
 Dho, a village in Nepal
 Dhodia language, spoken in Gujarat, India
 Dholpur Junction railway station, in India
 Digital Humanities Observatory
 Hohenstein-Ernstthal station, in Germany
 Semiheavy water